John Denyas (fl. 1298), was an English politician.

He was a Member (MP) of the Parliament of England for Lancashire in 1298.

References

Year of birth unknown
Year of death unknown
English MPs 1298
Place of birth unknown
Members of the Parliament of England (pre-1707) for Lancashire